Rutberget is a 342 meter high mountain north of Örnsköldsvik, Sweden.

Mountains of Sweden
Landforms of Västernorrland County